Ian Hunter may refer to:

 Ian Hunter (actor) (1900–1975), South African-born British actor
 Ian Hunter (admiral) (1939–2022), New Zealand naval officer
 Ian Hunter (artist) (1939–2017), British artist and Dean of Saint Martin's School of Art
 Ian Hunter (cricketer) (born 1979), British cricketer
 Ian Hunter (impresario) (1919–2003), British classical music and talent promoter
 Ian Hunter (politician) (born 1960), South Australian Labor Party politician
 Ian Hunter (rugby union) (born 1969), English rugby player and media marketer
 Ian Hunter (Scottish footballer) (fl. 1960s), Scottish footballer (Falkirk)
 Ian Hunter (singer) (born 1939), English singer-songwriter, former frontman of Mott the Hoople
 Ian Hunter (album), his debut 1975 solo album
 Ian Hunter (soccer) (born 1961), Australian footballer
 Ian Hunter (visual effects supervisor), visual effects artist 
 Ian McLellan Hunter (1915–1991), English screenwriter